Caloptilia rhodinella is a moth of the family Gracillariidae. It is known from Albania, Austria, Croatia, Germany, Hungary, Italy, Romania, Serbia, Switzerland, Turkey, the European part of Russia, India and China (Sichuan).

The larvae feed on Quercus species, including Quercus robur.

References

rhodinella
Moths of Europe
Moths of Asia
Moths described in 1855